The Europaturm ("Tower of Europe") is a   high telecommunications tower in Frankfurt, Germany.

History
 
Designed by architect Erwin Heinle, the tower's construction began in 1974. At its completion five years later, it became the tallest free-standing structure in the Federal Republic of Germany.

The top of the tower can turn and provides a panoramic view of the Rhine Main area. For a number of years, the upper part of the structure housed a restaurant and discothèque, but since 1999, the Europaturm has been closed to the public.

The six-ton antenna was lifted to the top in two parts by helicopter.

Broadcast capability

With the new antenna, the tower became capable of broadcasting high-definition digital television signals using the DVB-T standard (which is the European counterpart to the ATSC digital standard used in the United States). It is capable of broadcasting four channels per transmitter, for a total of twenty-four channels, at 100 kilowatts per channel. It is capable of receiving satellite broadcasts and redistributing them via cable or terrestrial broadcasts.

The tower is owned and operated by T-Systems, a subsidiary of Deutsche Telekom. At night, it is illuminated with magenta lighting, the company's corporate colours.

Among Frankfurt's residents, the tower is colloquially known as the "Ginnemer Spaschel" (Frankfurt dialect for "The Ginnheimer Asparagus", or "Ginnheimer Spargel" in standard German), even though it is located in the Bockenheim district rather than close by Ginnheim. It is also simply called the "Fernsehturm" ("Television Tower").

Elevator test tower
Since around 2002 a small elevator company has used the tower for testing and demonstrations.

See also
 List of towers
 List of tallest freestanding structures in the world

References

External links

 Europaturm in SKYLINE ATLAS
 
 Europaturm at Building Database Phorio

Towers completed in 1979
Observation towers in Hesse
Communication towers in Germany
Buildings and structures in Frankfurt
Restaurant towers
1979 establishments in West Germany